Sabir K. Muhammad (born April 14, 1976, in Louisville) is an American swimmer. He represented the United States in international competition as a butterfly and freestyle swimmer. Muhammad graduated from Stanford University in 1998. Muhammad finished his collegiate career with 7 Pac-10 championship titles, 25 All-American honors and 3 NCAA, US Open and American Records. Muhammad graduated from Stanford as an Academic All-American with a degree in International Relations. Muhammad holds an MBA from Goizueta Business School at Emory University. In 2000, he competed in the Short Course World Championships held in Athens, Greece winning both silver and bronze medals. At those world championships, Muhammad became the first African-American to win a medal at a major international swimming competition. He has broken a total of 10 American Records in his career. He is a two-time Short Course World Championship medalist, a four-time US Open champion, a five-time World Cup Swimming champion and a two-time runner-up at US Nationals.

Muhammad has been an advocate for swimming in multicultural communities for nearly 15 years. In 2003, Muhammad helped found a learn-to-swim program with the Boys and Girls Clubs of Metro Atlanta that eventually became a pilot for USA Swimming's Make a Splash Program in 2007.

See also 

 Diversity in swimming

References

External links
 
 Sabir K Muhammad at U.S. Masters Swimming
 "Black History Month Trailblazers: Sabir Muhammad" at USA Swimming
 
 Sabir Muhammad at SwimSwam
 

1976 births
Living people
Medalists at the FINA World Swimming Championships (25 m)
Pan American Games competitors for the United States
Swimmers at the 1999 Pan American Games
Stanford University alumni
Goizueta Business School alumni
Sportspeople from Louisville, Kentucky